Valerie Mullins (born 17 January 1935) is a British gymnast. She competed in seven events at the 1952 Summer Olympics.

References

1935 births
Living people
British female artistic gymnasts
Olympic gymnasts of Great Britain
Gymnasts at the 1952 Summer Olympics
Sportspeople from Swansea